Olga Mærsk is the name of three container ships and two tanker operated by the Mærsk line. The Olga Mærsk class of ships is named for the 2003-built ship:

  (1948–1979), a  container ship sold by Mærsk in 1968
  (1970–1995), a  container ship, subsequently named Asya I (1981–1989), Sunderland (1989–1993), Yellow Island (1993–1995) and Delta Joy (1995–1997)
  (1984–2001), a  LPG tanker, renamed as Sine Mærsk in 1992 and finally Mærsk Stafford (1993–2001)
 Olga Mærsk (1992–2002), a  tanker originally named  (1987–1992). Subsequently named Jacaranda (2002–2004), Tristar Kuwait (2004–2012) and Kuwait (2012–)
  (2003–present), a  container ship, first in the Olga Mærsk class

References

Ship names